Collins Reef, also known as Johnson North Reef/Johnson Reef North; ; Roxas Reef; Mandarin , is a Vietnamese occupied and controlled reef and the westernmost feature of Union Banks Atoll near the centre of Dangerous Ground in the Spratly islands in the South China Sea. It is also claimed by China (PRC), Taiwan (ROC), and the Philippines.

Location 

References

External links
Maritime Transparency Initiative Island Tracker

Reefs of the Spratly Islands
Union Banks